Suguna Foods Private Limited is a billion-dollar Indian multinational food products company headquartered in Coimbatore, India. The company was started in 1984 and is involved in broiler farming, hatcheries, feed mills, processing plants, and vaccines manufacturing for poultry. It markets and exports broiler chicken, frozen chicken, chicken eggs, and is the largest poultry company in India.

History

Founders
Mr. B. Soundararajan and Mr. G. B. Sundararajan were the founders of Suguna Foods. They hail from a village near Udumalpet. Their parents were school teachers. They entered agriculture after successful completion of school. They were Agriculturalists when they started cattle and poultry farms simultaneously.

1984–90
In 1984 they started a small poultry farm with a small investment of Rs 5000. In 1986 they started a poultry-related trading firm. In 1990 the situations around them demanded them to pioneer the concept of contract farming for the first time in India.

Contract farming
In this contract farming concept, the company provides chicks, feed, healthcare, and Technical support. The farmer's responsibility is to have a poultry shed and manage it effectively. So farmers are able to get secured regular income from Suguna.

1990s
From 1990 to 1997, the company grew gradually. In 1997, the company got its first sizable turnover of 7 crores. Expanded their business all over Tamil Nadu and started professionalizing the company. At the end of 90's, they got turnover of 100 crores.

2000
In 2000, the founders moved into the neighboring states of Karnataka and Andhra Pradesh. They found an ally in several state governments due to their objective to Energize Rural India. They overcame the opposition of the middlemen with the help of farmers and the respective state governments.

2000 – present

Over a period of 35 years, Suguna has gone from strength to strength and has become an Rs.10500 crore company that makes it India's No.1 broiler producer in India. Along the way, Suguna's pioneering efforts in contract farming helped create thousands of rural entrepreneurs who share the growth successfully. "Poultry Integration" introduced and pioneered by Suguna in the country has energized the livelihoods of farmers in rural India.

Suguna ranks among the top ten poultry companies worldwide. With operations in 16 states across India, it offers a range of poultry products and services. The fully integrated operations cover broiler and layer farming, hatcheries, feed mills, processing plants, vaccines and exports. Suguna markets live broiler chicken, value-added eggs, and frozen chicken.

With the intent to provide consumers with fresh, clean, and hygienic packed chicken, Suguna has set up a chain of modern retail outlets.

Today, the company's brand Suguna Chicken is a household name in India. With its Suguna Daily Fressh outlets, Suguna Home Bites, Suguna Anytime processed chicken, and four varieties of specialty Suguna value-added eggs, Suguna is the undisputed leader in poultry products. Suguna Home Bites being the latest in its product range is a new category of home meal replacements.

In 2020, Suguna Foods has funded a $15 million contract with the Asian Development Bank (ADB) to maintain poultry agricultural production.

Awards and recognition

 In 1994 National Trade Excellence Award, Ministry for Power, Government of India
 In 1995-2000 Best Performance Award, National Productivity Council, New Delhi
 In 2007 Asian Livestock Industry Award, Malaysia 
 In 2010 Entrepreneur of the year, TiE, Chennai
 In 2011 Asian Poultry Personality, International Poultry Production, Bangkok
 In 2012 Green Ambassador Award, Rotary International
 In 2012 Entrepreneur of the year- India
 In 2012 "Consumer Products" Ernst & Young
 In 2012 National Entrepreneurship and Quality Assurance award, National Association of Public Health Veterinarians
 In 2012 "Agriculture Leadership Award", Agriculture Today

References

External links
 

1986 establishments in Tamil Nadu
Companies based in Coimbatore
Companies established in 1986
Food and drink companies of India
Poultry companies
Poultry industry in India
Agriculture companies of India